KDF may refer to:

Organisations
 Kerala Dalit Federation, a political party in India
 Kenya Defence Forces
 KDF Energy, Romania
 Kraft durch Freude (Strength Through Joy), the state-operated leisure organization in Nazi Germany

Other uses
 K22JA-D, a TV station in Corpus Christi, Texas, US branded KDF-TV
 Kentucky Derby Festival, Louisville, US
 Key derivation function, in cryptography
 Kinetic degradation fluxion media, for water filtration
 Kunst des fechtens, the German school of fencing, a historical system of combat

See also
 KDF9, a British computer by English Electric
 KdF (disambiguation)